is a Japanese professional shogi player ranked 7-dan.

Promotion history
The promotion history for Sasaki is as follows:
 6-kyū: 1993
 1-dan: 1997
 4-dan: April 1, 2001
 5-dan: April 19, 2006
 6-dan: February 22, 2012
 7-dan: March 11, 2020

Awards and honors
Sasaki received the Japan Shogi Association's 35th Annual Shogi Award for "Most Consecutive Games Won" for the 20078 season.

References

External links
  Official blog "晴耕雨読" (Seikōudoku)
ShogiHub: Professional Player Info · Sasaki, Makoto

1980 births
Japanese shogi players
Living people
Professional shogi players
Professional shogi players from Tokyo
People from Nakano, Tokyo